The men's 94 kilograms weightlifting event at the 2012 Summer Olympics in London, United Kingdom, took place at ExCeL London.

Summary
Total score was the sum of the lifter's best result in each of the snatch and the clean and jerk, with three lifts allowed for each lift.  In case of a tie, the lighter lifter won; if still tied, the lifter who took the fewest attempts to achieve the total score won.  Lifters without a valid snatch score did not perform the clean and jerk.

Artem Ivanov of Ukraine was on the start list, but he was disqualified after weighing in 500 grams overweight.

Arsen Kasabijew of Poland (who had competed for Georgia as Arsen Karabiev in Beijing) was forced to retire from the competition after injuring his arm and knee during his second attempt to snatch 174 kg.

Originally, Kazakhstan's Ilya Ilyin won the competition and broke the world record in the clean and jerk (with a lift of 233 kg), and well as the world record for the total (418 kg), but both records were later annulled for drug use.

The results of this event were significantly altered following the 2016 retesting of the original in-competition samples for banned substances.

Six of the top seven finishers, including the three original medalists, were disqualified after their 2012 samples were retested and found to be positive for the presence of performance-enhancing drugs. Thus, Saeid Mohammadpour of Iran, who had originally finished fifth, was declared the 2012 Olympic champion.

On 6 October 2016, the IWF reported that as a consequence of the IOC's reanalyses of samples from the 2012 Olympic Games, a sample from Norayr Vardanyan of Armenia, who had originally finished 11th, had returned a positive result. In line with the relevant rules and regulations, the IWF imposed mandatory provisional suspensions upon Vardanyan, who was later disqualified. Subsequently, Endi Karina of Albania, who had originally finished 14th, was disqualified after he also tested positive.

Schedule
All times are British Summer Time (UTC+01:00)

Records

Results

New records

References 

Results 

Weightlifting at the 2012 Summer Olympics
Men's events at the 2012 Summer Olympics